Horsfieldia reticulata is a species of plant in the family Myristicaceae. It is a tree endemic to Borneo.

References

reticulata
Endemic flora of Borneo
Trees of Borneo
Near threatened flora of Asia
Taxonomy articles created by Polbot